David Matheson may refer to:

 David Matheson, member of Moxy Früvous
 David Matheson (campaigner), known for advocacy of conversion therapy